Cedar Creek Ice & Expo Center was a 5,000-seat multi-purpose arena in Wausau, Wisconsin, that was in the planning stages.  It was to be completed in the fall of 2009.  When opened, it was to be home to an expansion franchise in the United States Hockey League.

External links
Village supports ice arena

Sports venues in Wisconsin
Unbuilt indoor arenas in the United States
Indoor ice hockey venues in Wisconsin